The Delaware River (originally called the Grasshopper River) is a  river located in the northeastern part of the state of Kansas.  The Delaware River basin drains  from the outflow of the Perry Lake reservoir. The river has been classified as a Category 1 watershed by the Kansas Department of Health and Environment, meaning that the watershed is in need of immediate restoration and protection.  The river is one of the major tributaries of the Kansas River.

Course
The Delaware River rises west of Sabetha, Kansas in Nemaha County. The river's course is generally southeast through the counties of Nemaha, Brown, Jackson, Atchison, and Jefferson in northeast Kansas.  The Delaware passes through The Kickapoo Nation Reservation and is an important river for the tribe.  Some of its main tributaries include Grasshopper Creek, Muddy Creek, Elk Creek, Straight Creek, Cedar Creek and Rock Creek.  The Delaware's course takes it through rich farmland and this gives the river's water a very muddy appearance.  Just south of Valley Falls the river enters Perry Lake, a man made reservoir to control flooding. It then enters the Kansas River just north of Lecompton, Kansas.  Some cities within  of the river include, Sabetha, Fairview, Powhattan, Horton, Whiting, Muscotah, Holton, Valley Falls, Ozawkie, Perry, and Lecompton, Kansas.

In Valley Falls it is crossed by the Delaware River Composite Truss Bridge, built in 1936, which is listed on the National Register of Historic Places.

Recreation
The river forms Perry Reservoir, which is a major regional lake for boating, swimming, camping, fishing and other activities.  The river is also great for fishing, and some of the dominant fish of the river include channel catfish, flathead catfish, carp, longnose gar, drum, sauger, crappie, and white bass.

See also
 List of Kansas rivers
 Lakes, reservoirs, and dams in Kansas

References

External links

Rivers of Kansas
Tributaries of the Kansas River
Rivers of Jefferson County, Kansas
Rivers of Atchison County, Kansas
Rivers of Jackson County, Kansas
Rivers of Brown County, Kansas
Rivers of Nemaha County, Kansas